John Lesley (or Leslie) (29 September 1527 – 31 May 1596) was a Scottish Roman Catholic bishop and historian. His father was Gavin Lesley, rector of Kingussie, Badenoch.

Early career
He was educated at the University of Aberdeen, where he took the degree of M.A. In 1538 he obtained a dispensation permitting him to hold a benefice, notwithstanding his being a natural son, and in June 1546 he was made an acolyte in the cathedral church of Aberdeen, of which he was afterwards appointed a canon and prebendary.

He also studied at Poitiers, at Toulouse and at Paris, where he was made doctor of laws in 1553. In 1558 he took orders and was appointed Official of Aberdeen, and inducted into the parsonage and prebend of Oyne. At the Reformation Lesley became a champion of Catholicism. He was present at the disputation held in Edinburgh in 1561, when Knox and Willox were his antagonists. He was one of the commissioners sent the same year to bring over the young Mary, Queen of Scots, to take the government of Scotland. He returned in her train, and was appointed a privy councillor and professor of canon law in King's College, Aberdeen, and in 1565 one of the senators of the college of justice. Shortly afterwards he was made abbot of Lindores, and in 1565 bishop of Ross, the election to the see being confirmed in the following year. He was one of the sixteen commissioners appointed to revise the laws of Scotland, and the volume of the Actis and Constitutiounis of the Realme of Scotland known as the Black Acts was, chiefly owing to his care, printed in 1566.

Later career
The bishop was one of the most steadfast friends of Queen Mary. After the failure of the royal cause, and while Mary was a captive in England, Lesley (who had gone to her at Bolton) continued to exert himself on her behalf. He was one of the commissioners at the conference at York in 1568. He appeared as her ambassador at the court of Elizabeth I to complain of the injustice done to her, and when he found he was not listened to he laid plans for her escape. He also projected a marriage for her with Thomas, Duke of Norfolk, which ended in the execution of that nobleman. For this he was put under the charge of the bishop of London, and then of the bishop of Ely (in Holborn), and afterwards imprisoned in the Tower of London. During his confinement he collected materials for his history of Scotland, by which his name is now chiefly known. In 1571 he presented the latter portion of this work, written in Scots, to Queen Mary to amuse her in her captivity. He also wrote for her use his Piae Consolationes, and the queen devoted some of the hours of her captivity to translating a portion of it into French verse.

In 1573 he was liberated from prison, but was banished from England. For two years he attempted unsuccessfully to obtain the assistance of Continental princes in favor of Queen Mary. While at Rome in 1578 he published his Latin history De Origine, Moribus, et Rebus Gestis Scotorum. In October 1578 he had an audience with Rudolf II, Holy Roman Emperor, and their discussions included making a double portrait of Mary and James VI.

In 1579 he went to France and was made suffragan and vicar-general of the archbishopric of Rouen. While visiting his diocese, however, he was thrown into prison, and had to pay 3000 pistoles to prevent his being given up to Elizabeth. During the remainder of the reign of Henry III he lived unmolested, but on the accession of the Protestant Henry IV he again fell into trouble. In 1590 he was thrown into prison, and had to purchase his freedom at the same expense as before. In 1593 he was made bishop of Coutances, Normandy, and had licence to hold the bishopric of Ross until he should obtain peaceable possession of the former see. He retired to an Augustinian monastery near Brussels, where he died on 31 May 1596.

Works
The chief works of Lesley are as follows:
 A Defence of the Honor of Marie, Queene of Scotland, by Eusebius Dicaeophile, London, (1569)
 reprinted, with alterations, at Liège (1571), under the title, A Treatise concerning the Defence of the Honour of Marie, Queene of Scotland, made by Morgan Philip pes, Bachelor of Divinitie, Piae afflicts animi consoleiones, ad Mariam Scot. Reg., Paris, (1574)
De origine, moribus, ac rebus gestis Scotiae libri decem, Rome (1578). This History of Scotland in 10 books was presented to Mary Queen of Scots in 1571. The general title of Lesley's History of Scotland is: De origine, moribus, et rebus gestis Scotorum, Libri decerm. E quibus septem, veterum Scotorum res in primis memorabiles contractius reliqui vero tres posteriorum Regum ad nostra tempora historiam, quæ hucusque desiderabatur, fusius explicant; and the title prefixed to the second part is: De rebus gestis Scotorum posteriores libri tres, recentiorum regum historiam, quæ hucusque desiderabatur, ab anno Domini . usque ad annum . fusius continentes. Nunc primum in lucem editi. It owes much, in its earlier chapters, to the accounts of Hector Boece and John Mair, though some portion of the topographical matter is first-hand. In later sections he gives an independent account, from a Catholic point of view, which is a valuable supplement and corrective in many details, to the works of George Buchanan and John Knox.
De origine moribus & rebus gestis Scotorum libri decem, Rome (1675), second Latin edition.
 Cody, E. G., ed., History of Scotland, 2 vols., Scottish Text Society (1888, 1895). A Scots language translation of the published Latin made in 1596 by James Dalrymple of the Scottish Cloister at Regensburg.
 Thomson, Thomas, ed., The history of Scotland, from the death of King James I. in the year M.CCCC.XXXVI to the year M.D.LXI, Bannatyne Club (1830) from a Scottish manuscript of De Origine
 Lesley's Latin continuation of his history from 1562 to 1571, is translated in Forbes-Leith ed., Narrative of Scottish Catholics, (1885), from the original manuscript in the Vatican.
De illustriun feminarum in repubtica administranda authoritate libellus, Reims, (1580). A Latin version of a tract on The Lawfulness of the Regiment of Women (cf. Knox's pamphlet)
 De titulo et jure Mariae Scot. Reg., quo regni Angliae successionem sibi juste vindicat, Reims, (1580); translated in (1584).

Editions
Söllradl, B. (2020) De origine, moribus et rebus gestis Scotorum VIII. Lateinischer Text mit Einleitung, Übersetzung und Kommentar. Vienna: ÖAW.

Notes

References
 
 Anonymous life of John Lesley c.1594 and his letters, in Anderson, James, ed., Collections, vol.3, Edinburgh (1727)

External links
 

1527 births
1596 deaths
Bishops of Coutances
Bishops of Ross (Scotland)
16th-century Scottish Roman Catholic bishops
Scottish abbots
16th-century Scottish historians
People from Badenoch and Strathspey
Alumni of the University of Aberdeen
University of Paris alumni
University of Poitiers alumni
University of Tours
Historians of Scotland
John
1596 in Scotland